Warner Beach is a small resort town south of the Little Manzimtoti River in KwaZulu-Natal, South Africa, and it forms part of eThekwini. It was laid out by surveyor P.A. Warner as a residential area in 1910 for government pensioners.

It is a coastal village, with a residential area and tourist, educational, and shopping facilities. Whales and dolphins can at times be seen in the Indian Ocean adjacent to the area. The annual "Sardine Run" is a migration of huge schools of fish, attracting tourists and fishermen. Temperatures are mild and pleasant throughout the year, due to the temperature-stabilizing effect of the warm ocean current that flows in the coastal waters. A pleasant sea breeze can often be experienced with a cool temperature and a pleasant sea aroma. The vegetation is normally green throughout the year. Adjacent coastal areas are Winklespruit to the south and Doonside to the north.

Surfing conditions are excellent at Warner Beach, which is why this small town has created some of the best surfers on a global scale. Close by lies the Aliwal Shoal, which is definitely one of the best dive sites in the area. Kit surfing, paddle skiing, canoeing, beach walks, scuba diving, jogging, and fishing are popular activities.

A name that is often used for Warner Beach is Baggies Beach, but contention exists as to the validity of the name.
Investigations show that the name Baggies Beach was originally used for St Winifred's Beach, which is also known as Subway Beach.
The beach known as Warner Beach was also called Crane Beach, due to the presence of a construction crane at a building site next to the beach.

An excellent short film of Warner Beach at sunrise, filmed by Dan Dedekind is available here.

History
Fred Mohnhaupt and Gus Brown are the forefounders of Warner Beach. Gus Brown was born in Durban and lived on the Berea.
Very close friends, Gus and Fred both worked in the wool trade in Durban; Fred who was his superior and a wealthy businessman, making his money in the wool trade in South Africa. Both loved the entertainment world, and had many friends in Durban and afar, together travelling abroad on many occasions.

With a vision, in 1914, Gus and Fred moved to Warner Beach, where Fred purchased 82 acres of vacant land; the outlined area was roughly Kingsway (Warner Beach School) to St Winifreds near Almond Rd from north to south and Coastline to Dimple Lea Rd vicinity from east to west.

Fred had the financial investment and Gus the vision and ideas, so together they developed Warner Beach. An infrastructure on their land was developed, with basic gravel tracks, buildings, etc. Gus Brown Road and other roads were built as they are today. They took on a local man, Ray Edkins, to farm their land so as to supply meat and vegetables to the hotel and area.

Gus Brown Road leads to a hotel, which they had built, the Strelitzia Hotel, which attracted visitors, and many of their friends travelled out from Durban to stay at Warner Beach. The hotel hosted many dances and a variety of entertainments. During and after the war, soldiers and airman visited Warner Beach and stayed at the hotel. Demand grew, so Fred built another hotel on his land, the Strand Hotel. Warner Beach became a popular destination for holiday seekers, attracting visitors from the Transvaal and further afield. Guests enjoyed participating in the many social activities set up by Fred and Gus at their hotels.

Developments
Developments in the area include:
 Blasting out the rocks of the Warner Beach tidal pool was done for Strelitzia Hotel guests to use.
 Establishing a bowling green in Warner Beach attracted visitors from all over.
 Donated land was used for a small church to be built so that weddings could be held in Warner Beach; today its St Mary's Church.
 Donated land also was used for a hall to be built to house various functions, known as the Strelitzia Hall for many years.

In about 1946, Fred Mohnhaupt and Gus Brown finally sold both the Strelitzia and Strand Hotels and moved back to Durban, where they settled down to their retirements.

Transport

The R102 Kingsway (Andrew Zondo Road) runs along the coast as the main arterial road of Warner Beach. The regional route links the coastal village to Doonside and Amanzimtoti in the north and Winklespruit and Umkomaas in the south.

The N2 highway cuts through Warner Beach, but the coastal village does not have direct access to the freeway. Access to Warner Beach from the N2 can be obtained either through the Seadoone Road interchange (Exit 137) in Doonside and the R603 interchange (Exit 133) in Winklespruit. The highway links Warner Beach and Kingsburgh as a whole to Amanzimtoti and Durban in the north-east and Port Shepstone in the south-west.

References

Populated places in eThekwini Metropolitan Municipality
Populated places established in 1910